The 2nd Infantry Division Getica is one of the major units of the Romanian Land Forces. The 2nd Infantry Division is the heraldic successor of the Second Army. It was active during the Cold War with its headquarters first in Bucharest, and after 1980, in Buzău.

Structure 2020 

 2nd Infantry Division "Getica", in Buzău
 1st Mechanized Brigade "Argedava", in Bucharest
 2nd Multinational Infantry Brigade Southeast "Rovine" (HQ MN BDE-SE), in Craiova
 2nd Mountain Hunters Brigade "Sarmizegetusa", in Brașov
 9th Mechanized Brigade "Mărăşeşti", in Constanța
 282nd Armored Brigade "Unirea Principatelor", in Focșani
 52nd Mixed Artillery Regiment "General Alexandru Tell", in Bârlad
 53rd Anti-aircraft Missile Regiment "Tropaeum Traiani", in Medgidia
 61st Anti-aircraft Missile Regiment "Pelendava", in Slobozia
 528th Intelligence, Surveillance and Reconnaissance (ISR) Regiment "Vlad Țepeș", in Brăila

References

External links

Divisions of Romania